The Yarenga is a river in the Ust-Vymsky District of the Komi Republic and in the Lensky District of the Arkhangelsk Oblast in Russia. It is a right tributary of the Vychegda. The principal tributaries are the Vezhay (left) and Uktym (right). The Yarenga is the main river of the Lensky District north of the Vychegda and collects virtually all the drain of that area.

The source of the Yarenga is near the village of Vezhayka in the Komi Republic. The Yarenga flows to the north-west through primeval pine and larch forests, enters the Arkhangelsk Oblast, and in the village of Yarenga turns south-west. It is noted for its many rapids. In the village of Ust-Ocheya, where it accepts the Ocheya from the left, it turns south-east.

References

External links
 

Rivers of Arkhangelsk Oblast
Rivers of the Komi Republic